Andrea Haberlaß  (born 26 January 1964) is a German women's international footballer who plays as a defender. She is a member of the Germany women's national football team. She was part of the team at the 1989 European Competition for Women's Football.

References

1964 births
Living people
German women's footballers
Germany women's international footballers
Place of birth missing (living people)
Women's association football defenders
UEFA Women's Championship-winning players